Canned beans refers to a number of products of beans sold after canning in tin cans.

Types 
 Pork and beans – usually a tomato-based sauce flavored by pork
 Baked beans – cooked in a sweet sauce
 Plain, cooked beans or green beans, with varying amounts of salt added

Brands 
 Bush Brothers and Company
 Van Camp's
 Heinz Baked Beans
 Luck's Beans

See also 
 Canned chili, which may contain beans

beans